Glen Hall is a small unincorporated community in Wayne Township, Tippecanoe County, in the U.S. state of Indiana.

The site is often considered part of the adjoining town of West Point.

History
A post office was established at Glen Hall in 1866, and remained in operation until it was discontinued in 1904.

Geography
Glen Hall is located at 40°21'15" North, 87°02'27" West (40.354203, -87.040843), less than half a mile north of West Point.  It is in Wayne Township and has an elevation of approximately 625 feet.

References

Unincorporated communities in Tippecanoe County, Indiana
Unincorporated communities in Indiana
Lafayette metropolitan area, Indiana